François Schubert (né Franz Anton Schubert (the Younger); 22 July 1808, Dresden – 12 April 1878, Dresden) was a violinist and composer.

After training with concertmaster Antonio Rolla in Dresden, Schubert studied violin with Charles Philippe Lafont in Paris and began working under the name François Schubert. He played in the Staatskapelle in Dresden from 1823 to 1873.

The son of church composer Franz Anton Schubert (the Elder, 1768–1824), Schubert was married to the singer and actress Maschinka Schubert (1815–1882) who was the daughter of horn player and composer Georg Abraham Schneider. Their daughter was the opera singer and composer Georgina Schubert (1840–1878).

François Schubert composed concert pieces, études, and chamber music, but is largely known for the bagatelle The Bee, a perpetuum mobile for violin and piano – a piece that is often misattributed to Franz Schubert due to the similarity of the two men's names.

Selected works

 9 Études for violin solo, Op. 3
 Divertissement sur des motifs de l'opéra Lestocq d'Auber in D major for violin and piano, Op. 4 (1836)
 Souvenir de Norma, Variations in G major for violin and piano, Op. 5 (1837)
 2 Nocturnes for violin and piano, Op. 7 (1844)
     Amour secret in B major
     La Sérénade in B major
 Duo concertant sur des motifs de l'opéra Rienzi par Richard Wagner for violin and piano, Op. 8 (1845)
 Alpenrosen, Solo über Tyroler National-Lieder in E major for violin and piano (1853)
 La Napolitana, Solo sur des thèmes napolitains in A minor for violin and piano (or string quartet), Op. 12 (1853)
 Bagatelles, 12 Morceaux detachés for violin and piano, Op. 13 (published 1856–1862)
     Impromptu (1856)
     Cantabile (1856)
     Allegretto grazioso in A major (1856)
     Allegretto agitato in D minor (1857)
     Andantino in A major (1857)
     Romanza espressiva (1857)
     Le Papillon (1859)
     Le Désir in G major (1859)
     L'Abeille (The Bee; Die Biene) in E minor (1860)
     Tyrolienne in E major (1862)
     Chant plaintif (1862)
     Barcarola in G minor (1862)
 Rêverie, Morceau de salon in G major for violin and piano, Op. 14

References

External links
 

1808 births
1878 deaths
German classical violinists
Male classical violinists
German Romantic composers
Composers for violin
Concertmasters
Musicians from Dresden
19th-century classical composers
19th-century German composers
19th-century classical violinists
19th-century German male musicians
German violinists
German male violinists
German male classical composers